March of the Norse is the debut studio album by Demonaz, released in 2011 through Nuclear Blast.

Track listing

Personnel
 Demonaz - vocals
 Ice Dale - guitars & bass
 Armagedda - drums
 Music and lyrics by Demonaz.
 Recorded in Grieghallen and Conclave & Earshot Studios.
 Produced by Ice Dale and Herbrand Larsen.
 Additional mixing by Kristian Tvedt.
 Mastered at Strype Audio by Tom Kvalsvoll.

References

2011 debut albums
Albums with cover art by Pär Olofsson
Harald Nævdal albums
Nuclear Blast albums